Kuybyshev is the name of several inhabited localities in Russia.

Modern localities
Urban localities
Kuybyshev, Novosibirsk Oblast, a town in Novosibirsk Oblast

Rural localities
Kuybyshev, Volgograd Oblast, a settlement in Kuybyshevsky Selsoviet of Sredneakhtubinsky District in Volgograd Oblast

Renamed localities
Kuybyshev, name of Samara, a city in Samara Oblast, in 1935–1990
Kuybyshev, name of Bolgar, a town in Spassky District of the Republic of Tatarstan, in 1935–1991

Alternative names
Kuybyshev, alternative name of Kuybyshevo, a rural locality (a settlement) in Kuybyshevsky Selsoviet of Rubtsovsky District in Altai Krai;